Team San Jose (TSJ), also known as Visit San Jose, is a non-profit destination marketing organization and visitors bureau, created to promote tourism in San Jose, California.  Team San Jose was created in 2003 in response to a request for proposal issued by the City of San Jose.

Team San Jose is an economic driver in Silicon Valley, evolving into a $20 million company with more than 300 employees.

Properties managed by Team San Jose
San Jose Convention Center
San Jose Civic
California Theatre
Montgomery Theater

References

External links
 Visit San Jose official site
 Visit San Jose - About Team San Jose

Tourism agencies
Companies based in San Jose, California
Entertainment companies established in 2004
Tourism in California
2004 establishments in California